Bufleben is a village and a former municipality in the district of Gotha, in Thuringia, Germany. Since 1 January 2019, it is part of the municipality Nessetal.

Notable people
Cyriakus Schneegass (1546–1597), German Lutheran minister and hymnwriter

References

External links
Bufleben on Wikimapia

Former municipalities in Thuringia
Gotha (district)
Saxe-Coburg and Gotha